Zontov or Zontow ( from зонт, meaning umbrella) is a Russian surname. Its feminine counterpart is Zontova or Zontowa. It may refer to
Grigori Zontov (born 1972), singer of the Russian band Spitfire
Lidiya Zontova (born 1936), Russian rower

Russian-language surnames